Ooralea is a southern suburb of Mackay in the Mackay Region, Queensland, Australia.

Geography 
Ooralea is an outer suburb of Mackay. The Peak Downs Highway bounds the suburb to the north and the Bruce Highway bounds the suburb to the east.

Although a suburb, Ooralea is only partially used for residential housing with the rest still used for farming sugarcane. The Mackay Regional Council anticipates further suburban development in this suburb.

The Mackay Harness Racing Club operates the Ooralea Racecourse in the north-east corner of the suburb. A number of streets near the racecourse are named for champion thoroughbreds such as Makybe Diva Drive, Phar Lap Parade, Gunsynd Street and Bernborough Avenue.

Central Queensland University operates its Mackay campus at Ooralea bounded by Boundary Road and University Drive.

History 

Ooralea was originally known as Planlands after the Planlands railway station on the now defunct Mackay railway line which ran parallel to the Peak Downs Highway. The railway station was opposite the race track; it no longer exists.

Education 
There are no schools in Ooralea. The nearest government primary schools are Mackay West State in neighbouring West Mackay to the north-east and Dundula State School in neighbouring Bakers Creek to the south. The nearest government secondary school is Mackay State High School in South Mackay to the north-east.

Amenities 
There are a number of parks in the area:

 Bernborough Avenue Park
 Bradco Ave Park

 Dickens Ave Park

 Downing Street Park

 George Moore Park

References

External links 

 

Suburbs of Mackay, Queensland